Philip Anthony Clairmont (1949–1984) was a New Zealand painter.

Biography
Clairmont was born on 15 September 1949 in Nelson and named Philip Anthony Haines until his mother changed the family name in the early seventies. He attended Nelson College from 1963 to 1966. He studied in Christchurch under Rudolf Gopas, graduating from the Canterbury School of Fine Arts in 1970. 

In 1969 he married Viki Hansen and their daughter Melissa was born the same year.

In 1973 he received a Queen Elizabeth II Arts Council grant and the family moved to Waikanae north of Wellington and four years later to 39 Roy Street in Wellington. Clairmont’s final move was to Auckland in 1977. In 1979 he had another child, this time with his partner Rachel Power, a son named Orlando.

Clairmont's work was informed by the works of Vincent van Gogh and Francis Bacon, and was also influenced by his close relationship with fellow New Zealand artists Tony Fomison and Allen Maddox. His work is usually classed as expressionist or neo-expressionist because of the use of strong colours and distorted forms, often with domestic interiors as subject matter. His early work tends to be focussed and detailed. During his final decade his work had a tendency to become looser and less intense.

Clairmont epitomised the stereotypical bohemian artist lifestyle and felt himself that this form of life was necessary for him to regard himself as an authentic artist. Clairmont committed suicide in Auckland in 1984, at the age of 34.

Exhibitions 
In total Clairmont had 26 solo exhibitions. The first was at Several Arts in Christchurch in 1970 while still at art school. In 1972 Clairmont was invited to join The Group and exhibited Fireplace, part of a large mural painted for the Christchurch nightclub 5 Jellies in 1971. When the club burnt down the painting had been rescued and later cut into three panels Fireplace, Lampshade and Couch, Chair and Ashtray. Clairmont showed with The Group on a number of occasions and in 1977 he sent Staircase Triptych 36 Roy Street to include in the final Group Show, The Group & the Last. 

From 1972 on Clairmont was represented by dealer galleries in Christchurch, Wellington and Auckland including Bett-Duncan Gallery, New Vision Gallery and later Peter Webb Galleries, Dennis Cohen Gallery and Auckland’s Closet Artists Gallery. In the early seventies he exhibited many of his works in series, in particular Mirrors in 1974 and Wardrobes in 1976.

Clairmont was also admired for his drawing and print-making abilities and most exhibitions included prints and drawings included. At the beginning of Part 2 of Bruce Morrison’s film referenced below you can see Clairmont inking and pulling a print of Large Still Life with Objects. 

In 1984, shortly after his death, Clairmont featured in the exhibition Anxious Images: Aspects of New Zealand Art curated by Alexa Johnson for the Auckland City Art Gallery. In 1987, a survey show of Clairmont’s work was organised by the Sarjeant Gallery in Whanganui and toured New Zealand.

Further reading 
The resurrection of Philip Clairmont, a biography of Clairmont written by Martin Edmond in 1990 and published by the Auckland University Press, was a finalist in the 2000 Montana New Zealand Book Awards.

Archive media
In 1981 TVNZ made a two-part documentary profiling Clairmont. Director Bruce Morrison filmed Clairmont in his Mount Eden residence in Auckland. This documentary is freely available to view online.

The Cultural Icons series includes a video interview by Hamish Keith of Martin Edmond, Clairmont’s biographer. It can be viewed online.

References

External links
 Photographic portrait of Clairmont by Marti Friedlander
 Philip Clairmont in the collection of the Museum of New Zealand Te Papa Tongarewa

1949 births
1984 deaths
People from Nelson, New Zealand
People educated at Nelson College
20th-century New Zealand painters
20th-century New Zealand male artists
1984 suicides
Suicides in New Zealand
Ilam School of Fine Arts alumni